Richard "Dicky" Lunn was a Republic of Ireland international footballer.

Lunn was capped twice for the Republic of Ireland at senior level. He made his debut in a 4–0 friendly victory over Switzerland on 18 September 1938 .

References

External links
 Profile from soccerscene.ie

Republic of Ireland association footballers
Republic of Ireland international footballers
Dundalk F.C. players
Association footballers not categorized by position
Year of birth missing